Jeffrey Blue (born November 21, 1967) is a A&R executive, record-producer, and songwriter who is currently an A&R consultant for Atlantic Records. He has worked as the Senior Vice President of A&R and staff producer for Warner Bros. Records, Interscope Records, Virgin Records, Capitol Records, Sony BMG, Jive Records, RCA Records, and J Records. He specializes in discovering, developing, and signing unsigned artists. Blue most notably discovered Linkin Park, Macy Gray, Daniel Powter, and The Last Goodnight. In addition to signing Limp Bizkit and Korn to publishing deals, he has also written singles for artists such as Hoobastank, Syndicate, and The Last Goodnight.

Biography
Blue attended the University of California, Los Angeles (UCLA), where he studied Communications focusing on Media Law. Blue played drums while in college. He interned for the local CBS TV News Department. Blue then attended Loyola Law School in Los Angeles to pursue a career as an attorney. Blue passed the bar exam and found work as a lawyer, but lost passion for the profession. Blue became a music journalist for Billboard, HITS, and Entertainment Weekly, and eventually published his own magazine, Crossroads, which focused on discovering unsigned artists. He also pursued a career in acting and appeared in television commercials.  

Blue joined Zomba Music Publishing in 1995 and became the label's vice president of A&R while also teaching classes at UCLA. He met Brad Delson at UCLA, then a student, who became his intern. Blue mentored Delson and took interest in his band, Linkin Park, which he had just cofounded with Mike Shinoda. Blue played a pivotal role in Linkin Park's early history. He helped the band find vocalist Chester Bennington. After Blue left Zomba and joined Warner Records, he signed Linkin Park to their first record deal.  

Blue also developed and co-wrote with Macy Gray. After recording Gray's demos, Blue secured a deal for the artist with Epic Records and led to him co-writing the top-10 hit "Still" for Gray. During this time Blue also signed rock bands Korn and Limp Bizkit to publishing deals. 

Beyond A&R, He has directly collaborated with artists to write and produce music. Blue wrote Hoobastank's "So Close, So Far", while also producing Better Than Ezra's album Before the Robots. He was also the executive producer for Queen of the Damned's soundtrack. In 2007, Blue collaborated with The Last Goodnight to co-write the song Pictures of You, which won a BMI Pop Award. He also performed all the drums and percussion on the band's debut album, Poison Kiss. In 2008 he developed, co-wrote, and co-produced the debut album for Steadlür. 

In 2012 Blue signed, co-wrote, and developed WERM after discovering the band on Music Xray. In 2020, Blue released, One Step Closer, From Xero to #1; Becoming Linkin Park, a book detailing his early work with Linkin Park. His docu-series on the history of A&R is scheduled for release in 2022.

References

External links
 Jeff Blue Music Official Website
 Jeff Blue @ IMDB.com

1967 births
American lawyers
Record producers from California
A&R people
Mass media people from California
Living people
Musicians from Los Angeles
Songwriters from California
University of California, Los Angeles alumni